The 1984–85 Navy Midshipmen men's basketball team represented the United States Naval Academy during the 1984–85 NCAA Division I men's basketball season. The Midshipmen were led by fifth-year head coach Paul Evans, and played their home games at Halsey Field House in Annapolis, Maryland as members of the Colonial Athletic Association.

Roster

Schedule and results

|-
!colspan=9 style=| Non-conference regular season

|-
!colspan=9 style=| ECAC South regular season

|-
!colspan=9 style=| ECAC South tournament

|-
!colspan=9 style=| NCAA tournament

Source

NCAA basketball tournament

Rankings

Awards and honors
 David Robinson, ECAC South Player of the Year
 Vernon Butler, ECAC South tournament MVP

References

Navy Midshipmen
Navy
Navy Midshipmen men's basketball seasons
Navy
Navy